The 2020 Ladbrokes Players Championship Finals was the thirteenth edition of the PDC darts tournament, which saw the top 64 players from the Players Championship events of 2020 taking part. The tournament took place from 27–29 November 2020 at the Ricoh Arena, Coventry, behind closed doors, as it was announced on 23 September 2020 that the usual venue of Butlin's Resort in Minehead would be unavailable due to the COVID-19 pandemic.

Michael van Gerwen was the defending champion after defeating Gerwyn Price 11–9 in the 2019 final, and successfully defended his title to win the tournament for a sixth time, with an 11–10 victory over Mervyn King in the final.

Prize money
The 2020 Players Championship Finals will have a total prize fund of £500,000, the same amount that was available in 2019.

The following is the breakdown of the fund:

Qualification
The top 64 players from the Players Championships Order of Merit qualify, which is solely based on prize money won in the Players Championships events during the season.

On 18 November, it was announced that the Canadian 33rd seed Jeff Smith had withdrawn from the tournament, owing to the tough quarantine restrictions imposed by the COVID-19 pandemic in his country, so the next player on the Players Championships Order of Merit, Ryan Meikle became the new 64th seed, with the players ranked 34th-64th all moving up a place.

After the draw was made, Mensur Suljović withdrew due to a family bereavement, so he was directly replaced by Darren Webster in the draw.

The following players had qualified:

Top 64 in the Players Championship Order of Merit

Draw
There was no draw held, all players were put in a fixed bracket by their seeding positions.

Finals

Top half

Section 1

Section 2

Bottom half

Section 3

Section 4

References

Players Championship Finals
Players
Players
Sports competitions in Coventry
Players